Hypoponera ceylonensis, is a species of ant of the subfamily Ponerinae, which can be found from Sri Lanka, and China.

References

Animaldiversity.org
Itis.org

External links

 at antwiki.org

Ponerinae
Hymenoptera of Asia
Insects described in 1897